Enard Bay is a large remote tidal coastal embayment, located 10.5 miles northwest of Ullapool, in northwestern Ross and Cromarty, Scottish Highlands in the west coast of Scotland. The mouth of the bay is about 4.5 miles across running from the head of Rubha Mòr peninsula at Rubna Na CòiGeach (English:Ru Coygach) point to Rubna Na Brèige (English:Kirkaig point) to the east.

Settlements

In the coast of the bay, which travels almost on a north bearing downwards in diagonal from west to east has a number of settlements, the principle settlement is Lochinver, which is located on its inlet to the north west.

Geography

Enard Bay is bounded by Rhuba Mòr peninsula that runs from the northwest to the southeast in the south. To the south of Rhuba Mòr lies the Summer Isles and further which is in the verdant and ancient shire of Argyll, whose old name was A’ Chleit.

On the west most south coast of Enard Bay, before the coast bears northwest is an inlet that forms into Enard Bay from Achnahaird Bay. At the head of Achnahaird Bay is a large white sandy beach. To the east of Achnahaird Bay is Garvie Bay, with a small sandy beach. Slightly Further east is the small Lag na Saille inlet.  Polly bay is further to the east and north, close to the small rocky Green island. To the north of Polly bay is the sea  loch, Loch an Èisg Brachaidh located to the west of the group of small islands.

The bay has a number of small islands, of which Eilean Mòr, located on the northeast corner of the bay is the largest. Fraochlan Island located less than quarter mile north is the next smallest, followed by the Eilean Mòineseach. Green Island is a small island located to the south in the southeast of the bay.

A number of small fast flowing streams flow into the bay, the biggest amongst them is the River Polly, which flows into the Polly bay inlet.  

The sea lochs, Loch Inver and much larger Loch Kirkaig are located to the north of the bay.

Gallery

See also
 List of lochs in Scotland

References

Bays of Ross and Cromarty